David Meade is the pen name of an American end-times conspiracy theorist and book author who has yet to disclose his real name. Meade, who describes himself as a "Christian numerologist", claims to have attended the University of Louisville, where he "studied astronomy, among other subjects", but, because his real name is unknown, The Washington Post reported that the university could not confirm whether he had ever been a student there. He is also a writer, researcher and investigator who has written and self-published at least 13 books. He made appearances and interviews on Coast to Coast AM, The Washington Post, Glenn Beck Program, YouTube with pastor Paul Begley, and the Daily Express. He is best known for making numerous failed predictions, which have passed, regarding the end times, including that a hidden planet named Nibiru (sometimes known as Planet X) would destroy the Earth.

Meade predicted that planet Nibiru would collide with Earth on September 23, 2017, destroying it. After his prediction failed, he revised the apocalypse to October, where he stated that the seven-year tribulation would possibly start followed by a millennium of peace. In 2018, Meade again made several predictions for that year, for instance, that North Korea becoming a superpower in March 2018 and that Nibiru would destroy the Earth in spring. Meade announced that the apocalypse would begin in March 2018, but he didn't predict the exact date. After March 2018 passed, he moved the apocalypse to April 23, 2018, in which he also predicted the Sun, Moon, Jupiter, and Virgo will signal the rapture, and that Nibiru would destroy the Earth that day. However, before that date he said that reports that he predicted the end on 23 April were "fake news", but that the rapture—but not the end of the world—would take place on an unspecified date between May and December 2018.

Early life 
Meade claims he was raised as a Catholic and attended the University of Louisville, studying astronomy and other subjects. He also claims to have earned a master's degree in statistics. According to his profile page on his website, he has worked for both the federal government and private industry. He additionally stated that he has written investigative reports on abnormal state administration and executives for Fortune 1000 organizations. It is not known which companies he worked for. On his Google Plus page, he also claims to be an investigative journalist.

In a September 2017 The Washington Post article, Meade said that he studied astronomy and that he attended a university in Kentucky but declined to say which campus he attended due to safety concerns. He additionally refused to answer questions concerning which Fortune 1000 organizations he worked for and what he does for a living.  When he was asked where he lives, he claimed that he lives in "the heart of a major disaster" zone of Hurricane Irma, but did not specify the state or city.

Meade appeared on Coast to Coast AM with George Noory in January 2017 and was interviewed by the American national television and radio program Glenn Beck Program in September 2017. In addition to books about Planet X, he has written books related to politics, such as The Coming Clinton Economic Collapse (2016) and The Coup D'état Against President Donald J. Trump (2017).

Predictions 

Meade received extensive media attention following his predictions that Nibiru would destroy Earth on September 23, 2017. He first predicted Nibiru would hit the Earth in October 2017, but moved it forward to September 23. On September 21, an Orange County, California television station accidentally displayed his prediction in an emergency alert, and broadcasting officials stated that the false alert was caused by a glitch from a test by the Emergency Alert System. On September 21, he claimed in a Glenn Beck interview to have seen Nibiru from his house and that other people would see the sign as well. Meade then changed his mind and stated that Nibiru would not collide with Earth on September 23.

October 2017 predictions 
As September 23 passed, however, Meade again revised the apocalypse to October, making new predictions for that month, such as Nibiru eclipsing the sun on October 5 and that several people would levitate into the sky (including then-current U.S. President Donald Trump and Vice President Mike Pence) followed by a nuclear attack by North Korea, China, and Russia on the United States. He predicted other events for that month, such as a series of magnitude 9.8 earthquakes; that the Earth's pole would shift by 30 degrees; that the United States would be split in half; and that Barack Obama would be elected as U.S. president for an illegal third term. He also predicted that the 7-year Great Tribulation would start on October 15 and stated "[t]hat's when the action starts", but the month passed, and his predictions were incorrectly predicted. His October 2017 predictions were described in his book Will Planet X Signal the Rapture?.

Predictions for 2018 
In an interview with YouTube pastor Paul Begley, Meade made several predictions for 2018, such as North Korea becoming a world-class superpower in March 2018 and predicting that Nibiru would destroy the Earth in spring. In an article published by International Business Times on February 15, 2018, Meade announced that the apocalypse would begin in March 2018, but no date was given. He stated that several events in 2018, such as the January 2018 super blue blood moon eclipse, the 2018 Winter Olympics, and Israel's 70-year celebration of independence, were signs of the apocalypse. He called several officials in the United Nations "crazy people" after voting against the United States' decision to recognize Jerusalem as the capital of Israel, and his prediction came just 42 days before the blood moon eclipse.

After March 2018 passed, he changed the apocalypse prediction to April 23, 2018, in which he also predicted the Sun, Moon, Jupiter, and Virgo will signal the rapture, and that Nibiru would destroy the Earth that day. He referred to his prediction as "end of days convergence" and that the "disappearance of the Church will occur". Meade became the first preacher since William Miller to predict that the world would end on 23 April. On April 19, 2018, he stated that reports saying that he predicted the world would be destroyed on 23 April were "fake news", but that the rapture—but not the end of the world—would take place on an unspecified date between May and December 2018. He stated that the rapture would bring in seven years of "tribulation", followed by 1,000 years of "peace and prosperity", before the world is destroyed. April 23, 2018 passed without incident and Meade's prediction of a rapture taking place has been labeled by some as one of the latest "kooky" doomsday calls.

Other predictions 
Meade has made similar predictions in 2015 in his book Rapture 2015 and Planet X and in his 2013 book Comet Ison and the Return of Jesus, in which he stated that Comet Ison is the biblical star Wormwood and that it ties to Nibiru. In September 2017, he also made predictions that North Korea would launch a nuclear attack against Yellowstone Caldera from a used Russian submarine parked off the coast of California, and that the attack would trigger a supervolcano eruption. He believed that there would be flooding similar to the Genesis flood narrative and that only believers would survive. He also believed that Russia would be able to wipe the United States out in less than 30 minutes if a war broke out between the two countries.

Reactions 
Meade has faced criticism from fellow Christians: Ed Stetzer, writing for Christianity Today, stated that "there is no such thing as a 'Christian numerologist, and described Meade as "a made-up expert in a made-up field talking about a made-up event." Christopher M. Graney, a professor with the Vatican Observatory Foundation, noted that the supposedly unique astronomical event cited by Meade as a harbinger of doom was, in fact, quite common, having occurred four times in the last millennium. His theories were also debunked by NASA and Time writer Jeff Kluger, with NASA stating that Nibiru does not exist.

Albert Mohler, the president of the Southern Baptist Theological Seminary stated, upon Meade's previous prediction in September 2017, that "Christians are not called to be the setters of dates and the anticipation of the calendar." He went on to criticize Meade's predictions saying that "this kind of thinking should be an embarrassment to Biblical Christians". Judi McLeod labeled Meade as a false prophet on her website Canada Free Press after his prophecies failed to come true. ATLAH World Missionary Church pastor James David Manning has also called Meade a fraud in one of his YouTube videos. Brazilian astronomer Duília de Mello called his predictions and theories rubbish, and said Nibiru would have been seen during the eclipse and that Meade was using calculations based on the Gregorian calendar. British journalist Nick Pope stated that his theory had lack of critical thinking.

Meade has been compared to other failed doomsday preachers, such as Harold Camping and Nostradamus, and his September 23 prediction has been compared to other failed dates, such as the 2012 phenomenon and Y2K fulfilling Christian prophecy. After September 23, 2017 passed, a European mind reader and mentalist with the same name received multiple death threats when news websites linked him to the predictions. The man denied being the doomsday predictor and worked with a legal expert to have the false reports removed. Meade's Planet X – The 2017 Arrival book also received criticism as nonsense and plagiarism, with only 25% being his own work. On January 25, 2018, his predictions were labeled as "hype" by The Washington Post in a story about the Doomsday Clock.

Calculations 

Meade told The Washington Post that his September 23, 2017 prediction was based on numerical codes in the Bible. He also based his predictions on what he says are coded messages in the Giza Pyramids of Egypt. The specific focus of his prediction revolved around the Woman of the Apocalypse (referring to Revelation 12), another event that was supposed to take place on September 23 when a certain configuration of the Earth, Sun, Moon, and Virgo would happen. He stated the significant number for his September 23 prediction is the number 33, on the grounds that "Jesus lived for 33 years" and "Elohim, the Canaanite god who was later adopted as the supreme god of ancient Israel, is mentioned 33 times in the Bible". He stated several events, such as the solar eclipse of 21 August 2017, Hurricane Harvey, Hurricane Irma, and the Mexico earthquakes were a sign that Nibiru would appear on 23 September based on the Bible chapter verse Luke 21:25–26.

Meade's April 23 prediction was based on passage 12:1–2 in the Book of Revelation, which states "And a great sign appeared in heaven: a woman clothed in the sun, with the moon under her feet and a crown of twelve stars on her head. She was pregnant and crying out in the pain and agony of giving birth". He referred to the woman as Virgo and stated that the alignment represents Lion of Judah. When discussing the 7-year tribulation and rapture, he stated "The Book of Revelation states that men will approach Armageddon on horseback. Nibiru is here and the earth will be prepared for the next event on its calendar. That's all in the Book of Revelation, too."

Bibliography 
 
 Meade, David. (2013) Fraud Prevention.  Self-published on eBookIt.com 
 Meade, David. (2013) Mysterious Islands.  Self-published on eBookit.com. 
 Meade, David. (2013) Research for Writers. Self-published on eBookit.com. 
 Meade, David. (2014) You Can Write a Best-Selling Info Book!  Self-published on eBookit.com. 
 Meade, David. (2014) Web Design for Authors: Every Author Needs a Website!. Self-published on eBookit.com. 
 Meade, David. (2015) Rapture 2015 and Planet X. Self-published on eBookIt.com 
 Meade, David; Meade, Anne. (2015) Own a Piece of Paradise In the Florida Keys, Self-published on eBookit.com. 
 Meade, David. (2015) Hitler's Escape to Argentina. Self-published on eBookIt.com 
 Meade, David. (2016) Will Planet X Signal the Rapture? Self-published on eBookIt.com 
 
 Meade, David. (2016) The Coming Clinton Economic Collapse Kindle Edition. Kindle EBooks. 
 
 Meade, David. (2017) The End of Days – Planet X and Beyond Kindle Edition. Self-published on eBookIt.com

See also 
 List of dates predicted for apocalyptic events
 Apocalypticism

Notes

References

External links 

 Planet X – Project Omega, a website run by David Meade

21st-century American non-fiction writers
21st-century apocalypticists
American book editors
American Christian writers
American conspiracy theorists
American male non-fiction writers
American Roman Catholics
Christian conspiracy theorists
Christian writers about eschatology
Living people
Mass psychogenic illness in the United States
Numerologists
People involved in plagiarism controversies
Unidentified people
University of Louisville alumni
Year of birth missing (living people)
21st-century American male writers
21st-century pseudonymous writers